Umbrina is a genus of fish from the croaker family Sciaenidae. The genus contains 17 species occurring in tropical and warm temperate waters of the Atlantic, the Mediterranean, the Western Indian Ocean and the eastern Pacific.

Description

The species of the genus Umbrina are elongated, laterally compressed fishes with a rounded belly. The head is lower than the relatively high back. The mouth is small and set below the midline with a short, there is a short, stocky barbel on the chin with a pore at the end and two pores om wither side of the base. The eye is medium-sized and the diameter is a quarter of the length of the head. The teeth sit in two rows per jaw, of which the outer is larger in the upper jaw. The edge of the scales are finely serrated. The body is dark brown or silver-colored and has opaque stripes or vertical bars. The first dorsal fin is short and has ten thin hard rays. The second, long spine has 25 to 30 soft rays. The small anal fin has two hard and five to eight soft rays.

Species
Currently, 17 species are recognized in the genus:

Umbrina analis Günther, 1868 Longspine drum 
Umbrina broussonnetii Cuvier, 1830 Striped drum 
Umbrina bussingi López S., 1980 Bussing's drum 
Umbrina canariensis Valenciennes, 1843 Canary drum 
Umbrina canosai Berg, 1895 Argentine croaker 
Umbrina cirrosa (Linnaeus, 1758) Shi drum 
Umbrina coroides Cuvier, 1830 Sand drum 
Umbrina dorsalis Gill, 1862 Longfin drum 
Umbrina galapagorum Steindachner, 1878 Galápagos drum 
Umbrina imberbis Günther, 1873 
Umbrina milliae Miller, 1971
Umbrina reedi Günther, 1880
Umbrina roncador Jordan & Gilbert, 1882 Yellowfin drum 
Umbrina ronchus Valenciennes, 1843 Fusca drum 
Umbrina steindachneri Cadenat 1951 Steindachner's drum 
Umbrina wintersteeni Walker & Radford, 1992 Wintersteen drum 
Umbrina xanti Gill, 1862 Polla drum

Etymology
The name of the genus, Umbrina, is derived from the Latin umbra, meaning a shadow or phantom, referring to the fish's rapid movements.

References

Sciaenidae
Taxa named by Georges Cuvier
Ray-finned fish genera